Edmund Deberry (August 14, 1787 – December 12, 1859) was a U.S. Congressman from North Carolina, from 1829 to 1831, from 1833 to 1845 and from 1849 to 1851.

Born in Lawrenceville, North Carolina in Montgomery County, Deberry attended schools at High Shoals, then engaged in agricultural pursuits and also in the operation of cotton and flour mills.

He was a member of the North Carolina State Senate 1806–1811, 1813, 1814, 1820, 1821, and 1826–1828 and served as a justice of the peace. He was elected to the 21st United States Congress (March 4, 1829 – March 3, 1831) as an Anti-Jacksonian, was defeated for reelection in 1830. He ran again as a Whig in 1832 and served in the 23rd through the 28th Congresses (March 4, 1833 – March 3, 1845), becoming chairman of the Agriculture Committee. He did not run in 1844 but was elected to one final term in the 31st Congress (March 4, 1849 – March 3, 1851) after which he retired from politics.

Deberry resumed his former agricultural and business pursuits and died at his home in Pee Dee Township, Montgomery County, North Carolina, in 1859. He is interred in the family cemetery on his plantation near Mount Gilead.

References

1787 births
1859 deaths
North Carolina state senators
North Carolina Whigs
National Republican Party members of the United States House of Representatives from North Carolina
Whig Party members of the United States House of Representatives
19th-century American politicians
American justices of the peace
19th-century American judges